"When I Dream of Michelangelo" is the eighth track on Counting Crows' 2008 album Saturday Nights & Sunday Mornings (the second on the more reflective "Sunday Mornings" half of the record).

Although it was not released as a single, it was featured as the B-side to "1492" on a free downloadable "digital 45" that preceded the release of the album. In December 2008, it would also be serviced to the Adult Alternative (or Triple A) radio format as the third airplay single this era, following up the chart-topping "Come Around". It hit a peak of #7 on the chart on the 27th of March, 2009. 

The track shares a lyric from the band's earlier single "Angels of the Silences", from which the song's title originates: "I dream of Michelangelo when I’m lying in my bed".

Song meaning
Duritz acknowledged in a 23 April 2008 interview via Leo's Music Cast that the song is among the first he ever started writing:

Duritz explained the song's evolution more elaborately in a March 2008 interview with James Campion:

References

Counting Crows songs
2008 songs
2008 singles
Cultural depictions of Michelangelo
Songs about painters
Songs written by Dan Vickrey
Songs written by David Immerglück
Songs written by Charlie Gillingham
Songs written by Adam Duritz
Song recordings produced by Brian Deck